Jemma Griffiths (born 18 May 1975), known by her stage name Jem, is a Welsh singer, songwriter, and record producer.

Born and raised in Penarth, Wales, she began songwriting at an early age. After graduating from university in 1996, she worked as a DJ as well as co-founder of record label Marine Parade in Brighton. By 2002 she was focused heavily on writing and singing her own songs, collaborating with various producers in the United States such as Guy Sigsworth, Yoad Nevo, and Ge-Ology to help create what would become her debut studio album: Finally Woken, released on 24 March 2004 through ATO Records. Popularised by singles "They", "Just a Ride" and "Wish I", the album garnered generous sales and chart performance in the United States, Canada, Japan and Europe. Jem followed up her successful debut with her second album, Down to Earth, released on 18 September 2008. Her third album, Beachwood Canyon, was released in 2016.

Early life and education
Jemma Griffiths was born in Penarth, Wales, a small town near the Welsh capital, Cardiff on 18 May 1975. Jem originally found her passion for singing and songwriting whilst attending Stanwell School. During her early school years she explored her musical interests with the family piano, penning her first song at the age of thirteen. Jem has three siblings, older sister Chloe, (whose photograph appeared on Jem's first EP It All Starts Here...), eldest sister Georgia, who provided vocals for the Welsh indie/punk band Weapons of Mass Belief alongside brother Justin, who also goes by the name Yestyn, of Glass Pear.

In 1993, Jem moved to Brighton to study Law at the University of Sussex. This decision was due in part, because her father was a lawyer, and also because her older sister had attended university before her. Jem assumed it was the best route for her to take at the time, however, she had no intentions of becoming a lawyer, and continued to maintain her passion for music throughout the course of her education. Both during her studies and after graduating in 1996, Jem spent time as a club and festival promoter and also began working as a DJ in Brighton's lively club scene.

Career

1999–2006: It All Starts Here... and Finally Woken
In early 1998, alongside Adam Freeland, she co-founded and helped run the specialist breakbeat/hip hop record label Marine Parade. However, after spending two years acting as agent and promoter for other aspiring musicians, she soon felt that she had neglected her own musical career for too long. Therefore, in November 1999 she surprised her colleagues by leaving Brighton and returning to Wales, where she assembled a mobile recording studio and focused on developing her own individual songwriting and music production skills, completing a collection of four demos that acted as the basis of her break into the music industry.

In 2000, Jem moved to London where she met Sugababes manager Sarah Stennett, with whom she began a professional relationship. Stennett introduced her to other writers and producers. Two days into her first writing session with acclaimed electronic producer Guy Sigsworth (Björk, Frou Frou), the song "Nothing Fails" was born, with the lyrics eventually being picked up by Madonna for her 2003 studio album, American Life. In 2001, Jem travelled to Brooklyn, New York City, teaming up with hip hop producer Ge-Ology (Mos Def, Talib Kweli) and co-producer Yoad Nevo, where they succeeded in fusing her many musical influences to create a fresh and distinctive new sound. In March 2002, during a trip to Los Angeles to visit friends, Jem stopped by independent radio station KCRW to leave a demo of her song "Finally Woken" in Nic Harcourt's mailbox. Credited with being the first American DJ to play Coldplay, Norah Jones and Dido, Harcourt immediately began playing it on his show Morning Becomes Eclectic, whose popular listeners included big names in the music business. The track quickly became one of the most listener-requested songs at the station, landing Jem in their top 5 played artists of 2003, all prior to any record label being attached to her name. One of those 'big names' listening was Bruce Flohr, a top-level A&R rep for RCA Records and newly established ATO Records (known for introducing David Gray to American audiences). Upon meeting Jem, and listening to more of her demos, Flohr recalled thinking 'How do I not let this girl out the door without signing her?'. ATO Records quickly made the unanimous decision to offer her a recording contract. At that time there was no other label interest in her, because her status as a studio-only artist meant that she flew under the radar of most A&R. She was subsequently signed to the label. On 13 October 2003, in preparation for the release of the full-length album, ATO released an EP entitled It All Starts Here..., consisting of five adapted demos that Jem had initially recorded. In anticipation of the album release, Jem also relocated to Los Angeles, where she felt there was more opportunity for her to promote her work and explore her musical potential.

After the success of Moby's album Play (1999), Jem licensed every song on her album to be broadcast on American television programs, films and advertisements as a method of promotion. Television program The O.C. was the first to use Jem's music in several of their episodes, eventually inviting her to guest-star on the show, performing a cover version of Paul McCartney's 1970 song "Maybe I'm Amazed" in the first season finale. Since then, every song from the album has appeared in various television programs, such as Six Feet Under, Desperate Housewives, Without a Trace and Grey's Anatomy. Six additional tracks were added to the original EP, and the full-length studio album Finally Woken was released in the United States on 24 March 2004. 6,000 copies were sold in the first week, and a further 5,000 in the second. Unknown artists with little airplay or commercial MTV promotion rarely garnered this much immediate attention. To promote the album in the United Kingdom, Jem followed the traditional route of releasing CD singles and accompanying music videos across 2005. "They" became the UK lead single, released on 13 March 2005. Followed by "Just a Ride" in June and finally "Wish I" in September, which at that time was being used as the theme tune to popular UK reality television programme Celebrity Love Island. Jem quickly gained popularity in the United Kingdom, with her album spending 32 weeks on the UK Album Chart in March, peaking at number 6.

2007–2009: Down to Earth
In 2006, Jem decided to cease touring and to spend a year focusing on writing new material and developing her second studio album. She parted from Yoad Nevo and met with four different producers across the United States. Over the next few years she worked with Jeff Bass (credited with discovering Eminem) in Detroit as well as meeting with Lester Mendez (Nelly Furtado, Santana, Shakira) in Los Angeles. Producers Mike Bradford (Kid Rock, Deep Purple) and Greg Kurstin (Kylie Minogue, Beck, The Bird and the Bee) also collaborated with Jem to produce a record which encompassed a wider range of different musical genres, beats and styles. Her lack of specific genre classification actually made it difficult for ATO records to effectively market Jem due to her varying sounds and undefinable genre. During the production of her album, Jem wrote and lent her vocals to the song "Once in Every Lifetime" which appeared on the Eragon movie soundtrack.

Jem's second studio album, Down to Earth was released in the United States, Canada and Japan on 18 September 2008 with the European release of her album varying by each country between January and March 2009. The album peaked at 48 on the Billboard 200 and 64 on the UK Albums Chart The title of the album was decided by Jem whilst she was writing the first album and is a pun on the idiom 'down to Earth' in reference to her personality and approach to fame, as well as describing a fresh perspective of the world, similar to that of an extraterrestrial landing on Earth. The lead single of the album "It's Amazing" originally appeared on the soundtrack for the 2008 movie Sex and the City. Released 3 June 2008, the song failed to chart in the United States or the United Kingdom. Her following single releases off the album included: "Crazy" in August 2008, "And So I Pray" in May 2009, and "I Want You To..." in October 2009, however, they did not grant as much commercial success as her debut album.

2010–2016: Other projects and Beachwood Canyon
Between March and September 2011, Jem worked towards releasing an album to commemorate the 10th Anniversary of the 11 September terrorist attacks. She produced and contributed to a record entitled Ten Years On: A Collection of Songs in Remembrance of September 11th 2001. Other contributions to the album include songs by Pink Floyd, John Lennon, Alanis Morissette, and John Legend. The album is on a limited edition release for two years, ceasing production in September 2013.

In 2012, Jem returned to producing her upcoming third album Beachwood Canyon. In November, she recorded tracks at the Grand Master Studios, in Hollywood, and originally anticipated a release in early 2013. This date was further extended to the fall, until Jem confirmed in February 2014 that whilst essentially being complete with a confirmed track list, unforeseen delays regarding sample clearances had pushed the release into 2014, with earlier announcements being "wishful thinking on [her] part".

Jem has also mentioned that she has since been exploring other creative avenues outside of her music, with a strong desire to move into the film industry, she has spent several years writing a screenplay which she describes as being like her "Finally Woken in movie form". As of February 2014, Jem confirmed that work on her debut film was "finally happening", and that further information would be due as the year progresses.

In January 2015, it was announced that the album would be released within the year; it was not. In January 2016, Jem published on her Facebook page the first photoshoots of the Beachwood Canyon era and announced the official release of the album for spring 2016. The first single "Beachwood Canyon" was released on 1 July. On 5 August 2016, the album was released digitally worldwide while vinyl, CD and limited edition bundles were released on 30 August.

Musical style
Jem's musical style is varied and encompasses genres such as trip hop, electronica, pop rock and new wave, with critics often associating her with other female British musicians Dido and Beth Orton.

Personal life
In September 2009, Jem married American musician and songwriter Joseph George in Montecito, California. They had originally met in 2005, on the set of filming the music video for "Wish I", where George acted the role of Jem's love interest. They both currently reside in Los Angeles.

Discography

Studio albums

EPs
It All Starts Here... (13 October 2003, US only release)

Singles

Music videos

Various

Song usage

References

External links
 
 Jem biography from BBC Wales

1975 births
21st-century Welsh women singers
Alumni of the University of Sussex
ATO Records artists
British trip hop musicians
Living people
Singers from Cardiff
People educated at Howell's School Llandaff
People educated at Stanwell School
People from Penarth
Welsh singer-songwriters
Sony BMG artists
Welsh electronic musicians